Julia Montes is a Filipino actress of German descent who made her acting debut on television in 2001 in the drama series Sana Ay Ikaw Na Nga. The following years she made her first appearance in the soap opera in Sana'y Wala Nang Wakas (2003), Hiram (2004) and went on to appear in the television kids gag show Goin' Bulilit as a series regular until her departure in 2008. She also made several guest appearances on television in the 2000s such as Ligaw na Bulaklak (2008), I Love Betty La Fea (2008), Nasaan Ka Maruja? (2009), Katorse (2010), and The Substitute Bride (2010). Among Montes' releases of 2007 were the dramas Paano Kita Iibigin and Bahay Kubo: A Pinoy Mano Po! with supporting roles. In 2008, she made a brief appearance as Anna in Chito S. Roño's drama Caregiver. A year later, she had a cameo appearance in the supernatural horror T2 and another supporting role in the horror film, Dalaw (2010).

Portraying different roles in the drama anthology series Maalaala Mo Kaya, Montes starred in ABS-CBN's reintroduction of the 1990s series Gimik 2010—before her breakthrough role as Clara del Valle in Emil Cruz, Jr.'s Mara Clara (2010–11). Her performance garnered critical acclaim and established herself as a leading actress in television. In 2011, she made her film debut with a leading role alongside Kathryn Bernardo in Way Back Home. Also in 2011, she played teenager Samantha "Tammy" Magtoto in Growing Up and started to appear in the anthology fantasy Wansapanataym. Montes played as Katerina Alcantara in the romantic drama Walang Hanggan (2012), in which she starred alongside Coco Martin. She garnered the Princess of Philippine Television Award from the GMMSF Box-Office Entertainment Awards for her role. That same year, she portrayed the character of Ligaya Bustamante in the romantic-comedy The Reunion, her highest-grossing release, and appeared as an aswang in the horror adventure The Strangers. The following year, she re-teamed with Coco Martin on the romantic drama A Moment in Time for which she received her first FAMAS Awards for Best Actress nomination.

In 2013 after a successful appearance in another Maalaala Mo Kaya episode, Montes starred opposite Enrique Gil and Enchong Dee as the long-lost daughter Sarah Beltran in the melodrama Muling Buksan Ang Puso. She played as a childhood friend and wife to Samuel Hidlago in the period drama Ikaw Lamang (2014) for which she earned her first Gawad Tanglaw Award for Best Actress and PMPC Star Award-nominated role. In 2015, Montes starred in the romantic horror Halik sa Hangin as the delusioned teenager Mia Generoso. She was praised for her performance and it earned her first Young Critics Circle Award for Best Performance nomination. She also appeared in Wansapanataym "Yamishita's Treasures" alongside Coco Martin and in another Maalaala Mo Kaya episode. She then went on to play dual roles in Doble Kara (2015–17) as identical twin sisters Kara Dela Rosa and Sara Suarez, and appeared in the family drama Padre de Familia. Montes was awarded for another Gawad Tanglaw Award for Best Actress and the PMPC Star Award for Best Drama Actress nomination for the former.

Film

Television

See also 
 List of awards and nominations received by Julia Montes

Footnotes

References

External links 
 

Actress filmographies
Philippine filmographies